Lucia is a butterfly genus in the family Lycaenidae. It is monotypic, containing only the species Lucia limbaria, the small copper, of Australia.

References

Luciini
Lycaenidae genera
Taxa named by William John Swainson
Monotypic butterfly genera